Jangada River may refer to:

Jangada River (Iguazu River), a river of Santa Catarina state in southeastern Brazil
Jangada River (Piquiri River), a river of Paraná state in southern Brazil

See also 
 Jangada